Federal elections were held in Switzerland between 1 and 27 October 1848. The Radical Left emerged as the largest group, winning 79 of the 111 seats in the National Council.

Electoral system
The 111 members of the National Council were elected from 52 single- and multi-member constituencies. In six cantons (Appenzell Innerrhoden, Appenzell Ausserrhoden, Glarus, Nidwalden, Obwalden and Uri), National Council members were elected by the Landsgemeinde.

Results

National Council

By constituency

Council of States

References

Federal elections in Switzerland
Switzerland
Federal